Reform and Development Party may refer to:

 Reform and Development Party (Morocco), a Moroccan political party
 Reform and Development Party (Palestine), a Palestinian political party
 Reform and Development Party (Egypt), an Egyptian political party
 Party of Reform and Development, a Libyan political party